Mesosa binigrovittata is a species of beetle in the family Cerambycidae. It was described by Stephan von Breuning in 1942. It is known from Taiwan.

References

binigrovittata
Beetles described in 1942